Louis Frederick Roslyn (born Roselieb; 13 July 1878 – 1940), also known as Louis Fritz Roselieb, was a British sculptor noted for his World War I war memorials, portrait sculptures and bronze statuettes. Before beginning his career, he studied at Westminster City & Guilds College and the Royal Academy Schools. He enlisted in the Royal Flying Corps in 1915, but for medical or other reasons was put on the reserve until 1917 when he served at the School of Military Aeronautics and subsequently made Lieutenant. During his military service that he changed his name to Roslyn.

Biography
Louis Frederick Roselieb, later Roslyn, was born on 13 July 1878 in Lambeth, London. His father was George Louis Roselieb, a German sculptor who came to England from Germany to work.

Louis Roselieb attended Westminster City & Guilds College before entering the Royal Academy Schools, where in 1905 he was won a two year Landseer Scholarship for sculpture. Once he started to practice, his studio was located at "The Studio" in Clapham, London.

From 1906 to 1916 Roslyn worked at The Standard Plating Works in Rosebury Avenue. He was a "Sculptor and Electra Metallurgist". He enlisted in the Royal Flying Corps in 1915 under the name of Louis Fritz Roselieb. At the time of his enlistment he was 38 years and 5 months old and his height was 5 feet 6.1/2 inches. His wife was Ethel Roselieb and they had three children, Claude Frederick (12 years), Edward George (9 years) and John Bleckly (3 1/2 years).

At some point during his military service Roselieb changed his surname to Roslyn. It is not entirely clear when this decision was made; the statue of Edward VII had been done under the name Roselieb in 1911, whereas his work on the Imperial Buildings in 1914 was signed Roslyn.

Roslyn executed sculptural work for many war memorials in England and Wales. He also executed war memorials for Trinidad in the West Indies and for Cape Town in South Africa. The Duchess of York and Duchess of Connaught were among those of whom he was commissioned to do portrait busts. He was a Member and then Fellow of the Royal Society of British Sculptors. His membership commenced 1914 and his Fellowship commenced in 1923.

Military service
The young Roselieb, who often added "Vai" to his full name, enlisted in the Royal Flying Corps on 12 December 1915 and he described himself when enlisting as "a sculptor and living in Clapham" and to be working as "a sculptor and electra metallurgist". Rosyln was passed as fit to work on "electro deposition of various metals for use in connection with Aero Engines" and was deemed medically "fit for service anywhere but not combatant service". In his records, and with no explanation, it was stated that Lord Derby did not want Roslyn called up before 1 June 1917.

Having enlisted, Roselieb was put on the reserve, and in June 1917 was called to the School of Military Aeronautics, Royal Flying Corps, Reading, as an Equipment Officer, 3rd Class on probation. As a result of this appointment Roselieb was gazetted as a Temporary 2nd Lieutenant under the name Louis Frederick Roslyn. Subsequently he was promoted to Lieutenant.

Selected public works

1900-1915

1916-1920

1921-1925

1926 and later

Other works
 Memorial Fountain to Robert Fenwick and Harry Pollard Ashby, Wandle Park. Surrey, unveiled 1911. Roslyn worked on the classical water carrier, no longer in place, added to the fountain. It is fashioned in Italian marble, with granite steps and a Portland Stone base. 
 Bust of Sir Wilfred Lawson, Bart, current whereabouts unknown, exhibited at Royal Hibernian Academy's Annual Exhibition of 1908.
 A work entitled Case of Medals-Bronze was exhibited at Royal Hibernian Academy's Annual Exhibition of 1908.
 In 1906 a bronze relief, Dawn, current whereabouts unknown, was exhibited at the Corporation of Manchester Art Gallery on the occasion of their Twenty-Fourth Autumn Exhibition. The piece was priced at £2 2s.
 Head of a Young Girl, 1908, whereabouts unknown, exhibited at the Royal Hibernian Academy Annual Exhibition.
 Prometheus Unbound, listed as being shown at the Royal Academy from 1906-1910 but its present whereabouts is unknown.
 The Struggle, Whereabouts unknown, exhibited at the 1912 Royal Academy Exhibition.
 A 1921 bronze memorial plaque to the 254 men of the Oddfellows society of Ipswich who died in the First World War
 The Imperial War Museum in London holds a number of busts of British military officers by Roslyn in its collection.

Notes

References

External links

1878 births
1934 deaths
20th-century British sculptors
20th-century English male artists
Alumni of the Royal Academy Schools
British architectural sculptors
British Army personnel of World War I
English male sculptors
English people of German descent
People from Lambeth
Royal Flying Corps officers
Royal Flying Corps soldiers
Sculptors from London